Stephen Chow Sau-yan, SJ (born 7 August 1959) is a Hong Kong Chinese bishop of the Catholic Church.  He is the Bishop of Hong Kong, appointed to the position in 2021 after previously serving as the provincial superior of the Chinese Province of the Society of Jesus.

Early life
Chow was born in British Hong Kong on 7 August 1959.  He studied psychology and philosophy at the University of Minnesota, obtaining a bachelor's degree and a master's degree in Educational Psychology.  He subsequently joined the Society of Jesus in 1984, completing his noviceship in 1986. He joined the Milltown Institute of Theology and Philosophy in Dublin and gaining a Licentiate in Philosophy in 1988.  After obtaining the licentiate, he returned to Hong Kong and taught at Wah Yan College, Kowloon for two years.  Starting in 1990, he studied theology at the Holy Spirit Seminary in Hong Kong.  On 16 July 1994, Chow was ordained to the Catholic priesthood at the Cathedral of the Immaculate Conception by John Baptist Wu, the Bishop of Hong Kong at the time.  He undertook postgraduate studies at the Loyola University, Chicago, receiving a master's degree in Organization Development in 1995.

Presbyteral ministry
Chow's first pastoral assignment was at Wah Yan Kowloon and Hong Kong, where he was chaplain, teacher, and school manager from 1996 to 2000.  He commenced doctoral studies at Harvard University in 2000 and was granted a Doctor of Education six years later.  His thesis was titled "Understanding Moral Culture in Hong Kong Secondary Schools: Relationships among Moral Norm, Moral Culture, Academic Achievement Motivation, and Empathy".  He made his final vows on 17 April 2007.

Up until his appointment as bishop, Chow served as supervisor of both Wah Yan colleges in Kowloon and Hong Kong Island.  He was an honorary assistant professor at the University of Hong Kong from 2007 to 2014, as well as a part-time professor of psychology at Holy Spirit Seminary (his alma mater).  He was a participant at the Jesuits' 36th General Congregation in October 2016.  Chow succeeded John Lee Hua as provincial superior of the Chinese Province of the Society of Jesus on 1 January 2018.

Episcopal ministry
Chow was appointed Bishop of Hong Kong on 17 May 2021.  The see had been vacant since 3 January 2019, when Michael Yeung died in office after less than two years at the helm.  His appointment was described as a surprise by the Jesuit magazine America given that he was not previously mentioned as one of the likely candidates for the post.  However, the Union of Catholic Asian News mentioned in January 2019 – shortly after Yeung's death – how two of the candidates were Jesuits, without specifically naming them.  Chow revealed how he initially declined to be bishop in December 2020, as he was of the opinion that the post should be taken up by a member of the secular clergy.  However, he ultimately relented after receiving a handwritten letter from Pope Francis.  He was consecrated on 4 December 2021.

In March 2023, it was announced that Bishop Stephen had made plans to visit the archdiocese of Beijing in April of that year.

References

1959 births
20th-century Chinese Roman Catholic priests
21st-century Roman Catholic bishops in China
Alumni of Milltown Institute of Theology and Philosophy
Harvard Graduate School of Education alumni
Hong Kong Roman Catholic bishops
Jesuit bishops
Hong Kong Jesuits
Living people
Loyola University Chicago alumni
People from British Hong Kong
University of Minnesota alumni